The Battle of Dover, also known as the Second Battle of Fort Donelson, was a battle of the American Civil War, occurring on February 3, 1863, in Stewart County, Tennessee.

Background
In late January 1863, Confederate Maj. Gen. Joseph Wheeler, commanding two brigades of cavalry, took position on the Cumberland River at Palmyra to disrupt Union shipping. The Federals, however, apprised of Wheeler's intent, refrained from sending any boats up or downriver. Unable to disrupt Union shipping and realizing that he and his men could not remain in the area indefinitely, Wheeler decided to attack the garrison at Dover, Tennessee, which informers reported was small and could easily be overwhelmed.

Battle

The Confederates set out for Dover and began an attack between 1 and 2 p.m., on February 3. The 800-man garrison, under the command of Colonel Abner C. Harding, was in and about the town of Dover where they had chosen camps that commanded the area and had dug rifle pits and battery emplacements. The Confederates mounted a determined attack using artillery fire with great skill, but were repulsed with heavy losses. By dusk, both sides were mostly without ammunition. The Confederates surveyed the Union defenses and decided that the enemy was too well placed to allow capture.

Aftermath
Wheeler's force retired. The Federals sent out a pursuit but to no avail. The Confederates had failed to disrupt shipping on the Cumberland River and capture the garrison at Dover. This Confederate failure left the Union in control in Middle Tennessee and a bitter Brig. Gen. Nathan Bedford Forrest denounced Wheeler, a favorite of Gen. Braxton Bragg, saying he would not serve under him again.

Notes

References
Attack on Fort Donelson Original Reports
National Park Service battle description
CWSAC Report Update and Resurvey: Individual Battlefield Profiles

Dover
Dover
Dover
Battles of the American Civil War in Tennessee
Stewart County, Tennessee
1863 in the American Civil War
1863 in Tennessee
February 1863 events
Cavalry raids of the American Civil War